The First National Bank of Layton is a locally owned and operated bank in Layton, Utah. The bank was established in 1905 when the founders pooled together $25,000 to open a community bank. , the bank has seven branches throughout the Wasatch Front. The First National Bank of Layton's chairman, Kevin Garn, was named to the position in 2000. K. John Jones was appointed as president and CEO in 2007.

The First National Bank's first location, designed by architect William Allen, is on the National Register of Historic Places. It is one of only six Utah banks that have stayed in business for over one hundred years.

References

External links
 Official site

Victorian architecture in Utah
Commercial buildings completed in 1905
Banks based in Utah
Companies based in Davis County, Utah
Buildings and structures in Layton, Utah
1905 establishments in Utah
Bank buildings on the National Register of Historic Places in Utah